Kabardanga is a locality in South Kolkata in West Bengal, India. It is a part of Kolkata Municipal Corporation.

References

Neighbourhoods in Kolkata